Elections to Liverpool City Council were held on Thursday 1 November 1897. One third of the council seats were up for election, the term of office of each councillor being three years.

After the election, the composition of the council was:

Election result

Ward results

* - Retiring Councillor seeking re-election

Comparisons are made with the 1895 election results, as the retiring councillors were elected in that year.

Abercromby

Breckfield

Brunswick

Castle Street

Dingle

Edge Hill

Everton

Exchange

Fairfield

Granby

Great George

Kensington

Kirkdale

Low Hill

Netherfield

North Scotland

North Walton

Prince's Park

Sandhills

St. Anne's

St. Domingo

St. Peter's

Sefton Park

South Scotland

South Walton

Vauxhall

Wavertree

West Derby

By-elections

No.25, Brunswick

Caused by the death of Councillor Charles Arden (Conservative,  Brunswick, elected 1 November 1896) on 29 November 1897.

No.3, South Walton, 25 January 1898

Caused by the death of  Councillor Dr. Henry Richard Powell (Conservative, South Walton, elected 1 November 1896)
.

No.12, Edge Hill, 26 April 1898

Caused by the death of Councillor Jonathan Parry (Conservative, Edge Hill, elected 1 November 1895) on 5 March 1898.

No. 3 South Walton, 20 July 1898

Alderman Joseph Glover died on 21 April 1898.

The Right Honourable Sir Arthur Bower Forwood, Bart. MP was elected as an Alderman by the Council on 1 June 1898
.

The Right Honourable Sir Arthur Bower Forwood, Bart.MP resigned as an Alderman on 1 June 1898.

Councillor John Ellison (Conservative, South Walton, elected 1 November 1895) was elected as an Alderman by the city Council

No.24, Sefton Park, 18 October 1898

Caused by the resignation of Councillor Augustus Frederick Warr MP (Conservative, Sefton Park, elected 1 November 1895 which was reported to the Council on 5 October 1898.

See also

 Liverpool City Council
 Liverpool Town Council elections 1835 - 1879
 Liverpool City Council elections 1880–present
 Mayors and Lord Mayors of Liverpool 1207 to present
 History of local government in England

References

1897
1897 English local elections
1890s in Liverpool